The 1972–73 National Basketball League season was the inaugural season of the newly formulated National Basketball League.

By 1972, the Scots had their own thriving National League, though also competing in the "Rose Bowl", but when a London team, Sutton, defeated Edinburgh's Boroughmuir Barrs in the 1972 Final, the Basketball Association decided that it was time to relaunch the idea of an English National League. Therefore, the National Basketball League was inaugurated.

Liverpool were formed by a flamboyant owner called Vaughan Thomas who ran the Sports Education Department at Liverpool Polytechnic and they were the first club to incorporate a sponsor's name into their title, Bruno Roughcut tobacco from WD & HO Wills. They were also the first club to import an American, Larry Meek, specifically to play basketball. They played their home games at the Deeside Leisure Centre.

League Standings

League Title Play Off
Avenue defeated Liverpool 92-65 in the play off decider held at Loughborough College.

National Cup Final

Leading Scorers

References

See also
Basketball in England
British Basketball League
English Basketball League
List of English National Basketball League seasons

 
British
National Basketball League (England) seasons